CIMIC-House was the British Army-led Multi-National Division (South-East)'s centre of Civil-Military Co-operation activities in the Iraqi town of Al Amarah. It was situated in the former residence of the Ba'ath Party governor of Maysan province.

Determined to take the strong point, militia of the Shia Mahdi Army launched sustained attacks on the British positions at CIMIC House and the neighbouring Pink Palace, the seat of local government, beginning on 5 August 2004.

Al Amarah was garrisoned by fewer than 90 Soldiers from Y Company of the 1st Battalion, The Princess of Wales's Royal Regiment (including TA elements from 52nd Lowland Regiment), 60 from the Royal Welch Fusiliers, and two troops of soldiers from A squadron the Queens Royal Lancers (QRL). These units were part of the 1st Mechanised Brigade on TELIC IV. During the siege, they faced an estimated 500 militia who launched a total of 86 assaults on the compound over the next 23 days, ranging from section strength up to a series of company-level assaults with 100-plus fighters.

Incoming fire from the Mahdi Army included 595 mortar rounds from 230 different bombardments, direct hits with 57 rocket-propelled grenades and six 107  mm rockets plus 86 ground assaults on CIMIC (Civil-Military Co-operation) House itself. Y Company, 1
PWRR, based at CIMIC House, became the most attacked company in the entire Iraqi theatre of operations. In defending the compound, the British fired 33,000 rounds, and many Challenger 2, Warrior, and High Explosive 81mm Mortar shells and managed to persuade the US Air Force to drop a precision laser-guided 500  lb bomb onto enemy mortar positions in open ground right in the middle of a built up-city, defending their positions in trying to repulse the Mahdi Army in what has been described by Y Company's Sergeant Dan Mill's book "Sniper One" as "the longest continuous action fought by the British Army since the Korean War 50 years ago". It was also the "lengthiest defensive stand since World War II".

Fighting reached a peak between 5 and 25 August when the intensity was such that armoured convoys were unable to reach the base to resupply the British, although none of the waves of infantry attacks by the Mahdi Army got within 30 metres of the British lines. During this time, commanding officer, Major Justin Featherstone, was given permission to withdraw by his commanding officer if he felt events on the ground required it. Still, he refused to have his men leave their posts. Captain Charlie Curry was given command for six days during this time when Major Featherstone went on R&R.

At the end of the siege, six British soldiers were injured seriously in the battle; the only fatality on the British side was Private Chris Rayment who died when a traffic barrier fell on his head, after the linkage was caught by a Snatch Land Rover which was entering the camp in convoy, under heavy enemy fire.

The British estimated Mahdi Army casualties at the end of the battle at least 200 dead, leaving them as a seriously depleted force in Al Amarah, incapable of attacking the British in large numbers for the remainder of the coalition occupation of the town. CIMIC House was handed over to the Iraqis at the end of August 2004, with the British consolidating their forces in Camp Abu Naji.

Among the soldiers defending CIMIC house was a large contingent of Territorial Army soldiers who were mobilised to serve with the PWRR and QRL Battle Groups in April 2004. They included one Warrior (AFV) from B Coy 3 Scots The Blackwatch, Snipers from 1st Bn 22nd Cheshire Regiment, Territorial soldiers from the 52nd Lowland Regiment and Soldiers from various different squadrons of the Royal Yeomanry regiment.  Although these reservists contributed significantly to the defence of CIMIC house, their efforts were largely overshadowed by the regular PWRR (Y Company).

References

External links
 Details on the battle
 View of CIMIC-House from Google Maps
 Sniper One – Sgt Dan Mills (The blistering true story of a British battle group under siege

Military operations involving the United Kingdom
Military operations of the Iraq War
2004 in Iraq
Conflicts in 2004
Iraqi insurgency (2003–2011)
Occupation of Iraq
Princess of Wales's Royal Regiment
Royal Welch Fusiliers